Kanavuori is a district, a hill and a nature reserve in Jyväskylä, Finland. It is a part of Vaajakoski-Jyskä ward. There were 738 inhabitants on 31 December 2007.

Gallery

References

External links

Armoria Training Centre – an indoor shooting range, firearm and safety sector training centre in Kanavuori 

Neighbourhoods of Jyväskylä